The municipality of Guichón is one of the municipalities of Paysandú Department, Uruguay. Its seat is the city of Guichón.

Location 
The municipality is located in the southeast corner of the Paysandú Department, bordering Rio Negro Department to the south, and Tacuarembó Department to the east.

Features 
The municipality of Guichón was created by Law N° 18.653 of 15 March 2010, and is part of the Paysandú Department. It comprises the KEA, KEB, KEC and KED constituencies of that department. Its limits were defined in Decree 6063/2010 of the Departmental Board of Paysandú.

The territory of this municipality covers a total area of 1670.1 km², and it has a population of 6860 inhabitants according to 2011 census data, which means it has a population density of 4.1 inhabitants per km².

Settlements 
The following populated places are part of this municipality:
 Guichón (seat)
 Morató
 Piñera
 Merinos
 Tres Árboles
 Beisso
 Tiatucurá (also known as Villa María)
 Cuchilla de Fuego
 Termas de Almirón resort

Authorities 
The authority of the municipality is the Municipal Council, integrated by the Mayor (who presides it) and four Councilors.

References 

Guichón